Simon Hansen may refer to:
 Simon Hansen (filmmaker)
 Simon Hansen (athlete)

See also
 Simon Hanson, English drummer, songwriter and producer